Freemount GAA is a Gaelic Athletic Association club based in the village of Freemount in the north-west of County Cork, Ireland which forms part of the parish of Milford, Freemount and Tullylease. The club plays in the Duhallow division and competes in the Junior B Hurling Championship and the Junior C Football Championship. Due to a small local population, the club merges with neighbours Meelin GAA for juvenile hurling purposes. The amalgamated club is called St Mark's in hurling and St Peter's in football.

Honours
County
 Cork Junior A Hurling Championship
  Runners-Up (1): 1998
Cork Junior B Hurling Championship
  Winners (1): 2022
  Runners-Up (1): 2020
 Cork Junior B Football Championship
  Runners-Up (2): 1998, 1992
Duhallow
 Duhallow Junior A Hurling Championship 
  Winners (6): 1988, 1997, 1998, 2000, 2001, 2005
  Runners-Up (8): 1939, 1940, 1942, 1993, 2003, 2006, 2011, 2015
Duhallow Junior B Hurling Championship 
  Winners (3): 2019, 2021, 2022
  Runners-Up (1): 2020
Duhallow Junior B Hurling League
  Runners-Up (1): 2022

References

Gaelic games clubs in County Cork
Gaelic football clubs in County Cork